Cleveland Bay is a bay located on the north-eastern coast of Queensland, Australia. It is part of the Coral Sea and, administratively, is within the City of Townsville.

Entrance to the bay is marked by the Cape Cleveland Light and in earlier years by the Bay Rock Light on Magnetic Island.

History 
Cleveland Bay was named by Lieutenant (later Captain) James Cook on HM Bark Endeavour on 6 June 1770, probably in honour of John Clevland, Secretary to the Admiralty 1751-1763. However, Cook may have named the bay after the Cleveland Hills near his birthplace of Marton in Yorkshire, England.

References

Bays of Queensland
North Queensland